Daniel Jones was an association football player who represented New Zealand, playing in New Zealand's first ever official international.

Jones made his full All Whites debut in New Zealand's inaugural A-international fixture, beating Australia 3-1 on 17 June 1922 and ended his international playing career with six  A-international caps to his credit, his final cap an appearance in a 1-4 loss to Canada on 23 July 1927.

References 

Year of birth missing
20th-century New Zealand people
New Zealand association footballers
New Zealand international footballers
Year of death missing
Place of birth missing
Place of death missing
Waterside Karori players
Association football midfielders